Nicolas Reis Bernardo (born 4 June 1999), sometimes known as just Nicolas, is a Brazilian footballer who plays as a forward for Portuguese club Pedras Salgadas on loan from GD Chaves.

He was included in The Guardian's "Next Generation 2016".

Club career

Santos
Born in São Paulo, Nicolas Bernardo joined Santos' youth setup at the age of nine, and signed his first professional contract on 18 December 2015. In December 2018, after already featuring with the B-team in the Copa Paulista, he renewed his contract for a further year.

In March 2020, after failing to agree new terms and with his contract expired in December 2019, Nicolas Bernardo left Peixe.

Chaves
On 14 August 2020, Nicolas Bernardo moved abroad and signed a three-year contract with Portuguese LigaPro side GD Chaves. He made his professional debut on 18 September, coming on as a second-half substitute for José Gomes in a 0–0 home draw against Varzim SC.

Career statistics

Notes

References

External links

1999 births
Footballers from São Paulo
Living people
Brazilian footballers
Association football forwards
Santos FC players
G.D. Chaves players
Juventude de Pedras Salgadas players
Liga Portugal 2 players
Campeonato de Portugal (league) players
Brazilian expatriate footballers
Brazilian expatriate sportspeople in Portugal
Expatriate footballers in Portugal